Ünal is a Turkish name which may refer to:

Given name
 Ünal Alpuğan (born 1973), Turkish-German footballer
 Ünal Aysal (born 1941), Turkish businessman
 Ünal Karaman (born 1966), Turkish former footballer

Surname
 Ali Ünal (born 1955), Turkish author
 Buse Ünal (born 1997), Turkish female volleyball player
 Daniel Ünal (born 1990), Swiss footballer of Assyrian origin
 Deniz Ünal (born 1983), Turkish artist
 Enes Ünal (born 1997), Turkish footballer
 Gökhan Ünal (born 1982), Turkish footballer
 Mehmet Nadir Ünal (born 1993), Turkish kickboxer and amateur boxer
 Taylan Ünal  (born 1982), Turkish artist

Places
 Ünal, Kulp

Turkish-language surnames
Turkish masculine given names